Moore Hill is a mountain in Schoharie County, New York. It is located northeast of South Gilboa. Blenheim Hill is located north and Bald Mountain is located west-southwest of Moore Hill.

References

Mountains of Schoharie County, New York
Mountains of New York (state)